Gu Kuang (顧況) (fl. 757) was a Tang Dynasty poet.

Biography 
Gu Kuang was born around 727.

He died around 816.

Works cited

External links 
 
Books of the Quan Tangshi that include collected poems of Gu Kuang at the Chinese Text Project:
Book 264
Book 265
Book 266
Book 267

Tang dynasty poets
8th-century Chinese poets
Writers from Jiaxing
Politicians from Jiaxing
Tang dynasty politicians from Zhejiang
Poets from Zhejiang
People from Haining